Universidad is an administrative neighborhood of Madrid, part the Centro District. The areas of Malasaña and Conde Duque are located in the neighborhood.

It is 0.947641 km² in size. , it has a population of 32,866.

References

Wards of Madrid
Centro (Madrid)